Baba Punhan, born Atababa Seyidali oghlu Madatzadeh, (5 November 1948, Baku – 17 April 2004, Baku, Azerbaijan), was an Azerbaijani poet.

Biography
He was called up for military service in 1968, which he served in Kiev. He was praised for popularising Azenglish in Azerbaijani literature.

Music
Throughout his career he composed numerous pieces of meykhana based on modern Azerbaijan.

List of works
Baba Punhan published about 278 ghazals. His most well-known books include:
Acı həqiqət (Sad Truth, 2000)
Yalan çeynəyə - çeynəyə (Chewing Lies, 2000)
Mən nə dedim ki ... (What have I said..., 2004)

References

External links
  reprinted in an Azerbaijani magazine in 2005

Azerbaijani male poets
1948 births
2004 deaths
Writers from Baku
20th-century Azerbaijani poets
[[Category:20th-century male writers]